Shah Tut (also Romanized as Shāh Tūt) is a village in Shusef Rural District, Shusef District, Nehbandan County, South Khorasan Province, Iran. At the 2006 census, its population was 24, in 8 families.

References 

Populated places in Nehbandan County